Jean Deny (12 July 1879 – 5 Novembre 1963) was a French grammarian, specialist of oriental languages.

Biography 
Born to a French father and a Polish mother settled in Kiev, Jean Deny became familiar with the French, Polish, Ukrainian and Russian languages at a young age. After the baccalaureate, he specialized in Oriental languages (classical Arabic, Arabic dialect, Persian, Turkish and Russian). He became professor of turkology at the Sorbonne after he taught at the École nationale des langues orientales vivantes of which he was administrator from 1937 to 1948.

He retired in 1949 and died in 1963.

Selected works 
1921: Grammaire de la langue turque (dialecte osmanli)
1955: Principes de grammaire turque
1959: L’osmanli moderne et le turk de Turquie

References

External links 
 Jean Deny on data.bnf.fr
 Dictionnaire des orientalistes de langue française
 Colloque Jean Deny

Linguists from France
Turkologists
Writers from Kyiv
1879 births
1963 deaths
Academic staff of the University of Paris
Emigrants from the Russian Empire to France